The Dunfermline Reign are a Scottish basketball club based in the town of Dunfermline, Scotland.

History
The club have been an affiliated member of basketballscotland since their formation in 1986, and for many years the club was the only national and local league basketball team in Fife.

Home Venue
The club moved its home games to St Columba's RC High School in 2014 after the school won in its bid for a court removed from the London 2012 Olympic basketball site. The floor was the one that former player Robert Archibald ended his playing career on at the 2012 Olympics.

Queen Anne High School
St Columba's RC High School (2014–present)

Honours
 Men's National League Champions: 2018–19 (1)

Youth:
Under 14s won the u14s 2019-2020 Scottish league with the best run in there history, only one loss from 54 games a league win and topping the table by 38 points. For the first time ever the top five scorers in the league were all of the same team, with: 

 No.10 scoring 378 points
 No.7 scoring 368 points
 No.15 scoring 327 points
 No.32 scoring 295 points
 No.3 scoring 212 points
 and the most three pointers in a single game by team in game (26).

The under 18s and 16s league games could not commence this year as there were not enough teams to compete.

 basketballscotland 'Approved' club
 First Positive Coaching Scotland accredited basketball club in Scotland

Season-by-season records

Players

Notable former players

References
Official website
The Courier
Sport Hall flooring

External links

Basketball teams in Scotland
1986 establishments in Scotland
Basketball teams established in 1986
Dunfermline
Sport in Fife